Middle East Television  (METV) is a Christian satellite television broadcasting network located in Limassol, Cyprus. Programming on METV includes a mixture of Christian programming, plus non-religious entertainment programs like The Red Green Show, The Mary Tyler Moore Show, The Lone Ranger and NFL Football.

History 
On April 10, 1982, a Christian-based television station South Lebanon, Hope TV, was donated to the Christian Broadcasting Network, and became METV. At this time METV broadcast from Marjayoun. In Israel, METV was known for broadcasting WWF wrestling that was not available on Israeli TV.

On June 5, 1997, METV launched its 24-hour programming broadcast on the Israeli satellite Amos 2. This increased the potential audience from 11 million to 70 million viewers with a signal that is now reaching all of Western Asia (except Yemen), as well as Afghanistan, Egypt, Greece, Libya, Sudan, Tajikistan, Turkmenistan, and Uzbekistan. In anticipation of the Israeli decision to pull out of Southern Lebanon, Middle East Television began searching for a new broadcast facility in May 1999.

On May 2, 2000, Middle East Television completed the construction of its new station and began its digital broadcast from Cyprus. METV was sold to a like-minded ministry, LeSEA Broadcasting, in July 2001.

In September 2016, LeSEA sold the station to Sid Roth's Messianic Vision, Inc.

Logo 
The logo of METV, prior to the LeSEA Broadcasting purchase, used to be three cedar trees, in honor of the Flag of Lebanon.

See also 
 List of programs broadcast by Middle East Television

References

External links 
 Middle East Television (METV)

Television channels in Cyprus
Family Broadcasting Corporation
Evangelical television networks
International broadcasters
Television channels and stations established in 1982